Max Terhune (February 12, 1891 – June 5, 1973) was an American film actor born in Franklin, Indiana.  He appeared in nearly 70 films, mostly B-westerns, between 1936 and 1956. Among these, Terhune starred in The Three Mesquiteers and Range Busters series.

Baseball 
Terhune worked as a tool maker and when he was 20 he played semi-pro baseball for teams in Minneapolis, Indianapolis, and Newark; he also spent the 1913 season playing Class-D baseball for the Vincennes Alices of the Kitty League. 

During this time he became friends with Kermit Maynard, a star university athlete who launched a career as a silent western movie star that continued into the sound era. Kermit's younger brother was Ken Maynard, a hugely popular western star from the early 1920s through the 1930s.

Film career

Terhune performed in 21 episodes of a popular Republic Studios western series called The Three Mesquiteers. His character, Lullaby Joslin, was launched by another popular character actor, Syd Saylor, but then Terhune stepped into the series which, involving 12 different actors, lasted for a total of 51 pictures over eight years. His co-stars in 15 of the pictures were Robert Livingston and Ray "Crash" Corrigan. He then worked with Corrigan and John Wayne, who took over Livingston's role shortly before Wayne's career was launched by his starring role in Stagecoach. 

Terhune and Corrigan went on to work together in another trio western series, The Range Busters (24 entries with Ray Corrigan and John King at Monogram Pictures).  He did several supporting roles with Gene Autry (at Republic). It was Autry, with whom he had worked in radio in Chicago, who convinced him to come to Hollywood. Later he worked in Johnny Mack Brown westerns at Monogram. Terhune played the comic sidekick (Lullaby Joslin in the Republic Pictures Mesquiteers movies and usually a character called Alibi in the Monogram Pictures thereafter) — with a major distinction. He always traveled the range with his dummy Elmer sharing his saddle. Elmer received a film credit for his appearances.

Magic 
Besides being a ventriloquist, whistler and animal imitator, Terhune was a magician. Card tricks were his forte, and he often performed such in his movies. His former vaudeville act included juggling, bird calls and barnyard animal impressions, talents also incorporated into his sidekick roles. His hands doubled for those of Clark Gable in "The King and Four Queens" in 1956. He performed on occasion at The Magic Castle in Hollywood. (Source: Audio interview: Max Terhune 1971)

Later years 
He appeared frequently on weekends in the 1950s at Corriganville, a popular western film location developed by his co-star and friend who purchased the land in the late 1930s. Tourists paid to see stunt shows and musical performances as well as wander around the western streets where scores of films and TV episodes were filmed over 25 years.
His last film role was in the major Hollywood film Giant, in which he played the dramatic role of the physician Dr. Walker.

Family

Terhune married Maude Cassady and they had three children: Donald Roltaire, Robert, and Maxine. His son Robert was a stuntman who doubled burly actors like George Kennedy in films. Donald Roltaire was killed at age 27 in an automobile accident near Fresno, California, in 1958.

Death
Terhune died in Cottonwood, Arizona, at the age of 82.

Selected filmography

 Ride Ranger Ride (1936) – Rufe Jones
 Ghost-Town Gold (1936) – Lullaby Joslin
 The Big Show (1936) – Ventriloquist
 Roarin' Lead (1936) – Lullaby Joslin
 Riders of the Whistling Skull (1937) – Lullaby Joslin
 Hit the Saddle (1937) – Lullaby Joslin
 The Hit Parade (1937) – Rusty Callahan
 Gunsmoke Ranch (1937) – Lullaby Joslin
 Come on, Cowboys (1937) – Lullaby Joslin
 Range Defenders (1937) – Lullaby Joslin
 Heart of the Rockies (1937) – Lullaby Joslin
 Boots and Saddles (1937) – Wedding Guest (uncredited)
 The Trigger Trio (1937) – Lullaby Joslin
 Manhattan Merry-Go-Round (1937) – Himself
 Wild Horse Rodeo (1937) – Lullaby Joslin
 Mama Runs Wild (1937) – Applegate
 The Purple Vigilantes (1938) – Lullaby Joslin
 Call the Mesquiteers (1938) – Lullaby Joslin
 Outlaws of Sonora (1938) – Lullaby Joslin
 Ladies in Distress (1938) – Dave Evans
 Riders of the Black Hills (1938) – Lullaby Joslin
 Heroes of the Hills (1938) – Lullaby Joslin
 Pals of the Saddle (1938) – Lullaby Joslin
 Overland Stage Raiders (1938) – Lullaby Joslin
 Santa Fe Stampede (1938) – Lullaby Joslin
 Red River Range (1938) – Lullaby Joslin
 The Night Riders (1939) – Lullaby Joslin
 Man of Conquest (1939) – Deaf Smith
 Three Texas Steers (1939) – Lullaby Joslin
 The Range Busters (1940) – 'Alibi' Terhune
 Trailing Double Trouble (1940) – 'Alibi' Terhune
 West of Pinto Basin (1940) – 'Alibi' Terhune
 Trail of the Silver Spurs (1941) – 'Alibi' Terhune
 The Kid's Last Ride (1941) – 'Alibi' Terhune
 Tumbledown Ranch in Arizona (1941) – 'Alibi' Terhune
 Wrangler's Roost (1941) – 'Alibi' Terhune
 Fugitive Valley (1941) – 'Alibi' Terhune
 Saddle Mountain Roundup (1941) – 'Alibi' Terhune
 Tonto Basin Outlaws (1941) – 'Alibi' Terhune
 Underground Rustlers (1941) – 'Alibi' Terhune
 Thunder River Feud (1942) – 'Alibi' Terhune
 Rock River Renegades (1942) – 'Alibi' Terhune
 Boot Hill Bandits (1942) – 'Alibi' Terhune
 Texas Trouble Shooters (1942) – 'Alibi' Terhune
 Arizona Stage Coach (1942) – 'Alibi' Terhune
 Texas to Bataan (1942) – 'Alibi' Terhune
 Trail Riders (1942) – 'Alibi' Terhune
 Two Fisted Justice (1943) – 'Alibi' Terhune
 Haunted Ranch (1943) – 'Alibi' Terhune
 Land of Hunted Men (1943) – 'Alibi' Terhune
 Cowboy Commandos (1943) – 'Alibi' Terhune
 Black Market Rustlers (1943) – 'Alibi' Terhune
 Bullets and Saddles (1943) – 'Alibi' Terhune
 Cowboy Canteen (1944) – Professor Merlin
 Sheriff of Sundown (1944) – Third Grade Simms
 Harmony Trail (1944) – Marshal Max Terhune
 Swing, Cowboy, Swing (1946) – 'Alibi' Terhune
 Along the Oregon Trail (1947) – Himself
 The Sheriff of Medicine Bow (1948) – Alibi
 Gunning for Justice (1948) – Alibi Parsons
 Hidden Danger (1948) – Alibi
 Law of the West (1949) – Alibi Jenkins
 Trails End (1949) – Alibi
 West of El Dorado (1949) – Alibi
 Range Justice (1949) – Alibi
 Western Renegades (1949) – Sheriff Alibi
 Square Dance Jubilee (1949) – Sheriff
 Rawhide (1951) – Stagecoach Passenger from Missouri (uncredited)
 Jim Thorpe – All-American (1951) – Farmer (uncredited)
 Giant (1956) – Dr. Walker (uncredited)

Television
 The Lone Ranger – Sidney Boswell, episode: "Danger Ahead" (1950)
 I Love Lucy - Ventriloquist, episode: "Ricky Loses His Temper" (1954)

References

External links

 
 

1891 births
1973 deaths
American male film actors
Male actors from Indiana
Male Western (genre) film actors
20th-century American male actors
People from Franklin, Indiana
People from Anderson, Indiana